The Sunflower Showdown is the series of athletic contests between Kansas State University and the University of Kansas athletic programs, most notably football and men's basketball. The name is derived from the official nickname for the state of Kansas: the Sunflower State.

The two schools compete each year for the Governor's Cup in football. The football series dates back to 1902, and has been played every year since 1911, making it the fourth-longest active series in NCAA college football. The University of Kansas built a large advantage in the series by 1923, and leads the overall series 64–51–5 or 65–50–5 (depending on whether a 1980 forfeit by KU is counted) as of the end of the 2022 season.

The men's basketball series dates back to 1907, and is the most-played series in either school's history, and the sixth-most-played in NCAA history. Kansas has dominated the all-time series and leads the men's basketball series 204–95 following the most recent game on January 31, 2023.  This is the most victories by one school over another in NCAA Division I men's basketball. Kansas has led in the all-time series since 1922, and since 1984, Kansas leads the series 86–13.

In 2010, Dillons bought the naming rights and the series was re-branded "The Dillon’s Sunflower Showdown".

Origins 
The rivalry between the two schools can be traced indirectly back to their creation in the 1860s. The towns of Manhattan, Kansas (now home to KSU) and Lawrence, Kansas (now home to KU) both competed to be the site of the state University – required in the Kansas Constitution – after Kansas achieved statehood in 1861. Manhattan would have become the home of the university in 1861, but the bill establishing the University in Manhattan was controversially vetoed by Governor Charles L. Robinson of Lawrence. An attempt to override the veto in the Legislature failed by two votes. In 1862, another bill to make Manhattan the site of the University failed by one vote. Finally, on the third attempt, on February 16, 1863, the Kansas Legislature designated Manhattan as home to the state's Land-grant university. Yet the legislature was not done. When Lawrence met these conditions, the University of Kansas was established there in 1865.

The first recorded meeting between the two institutions in athletic competition was a little more than thirty years after their founding, in a baseball game in 1898.

Men's basketball 

The two schools have had a strong rivalry in basketball for several decades, peaking in the 1950s.  Recently, the University of Kansas has been dominant in the series, including a winning streak of 31 games over K-State that lasted from 1994 to 2005. Despite the lopsided record, the rivalry has become more relevant again in recent years, with both teams ranked in the AP Top 25 for many of the match-ups.

Jeff Sagarin's rankings of the nation's top programs by decade in the ESPN College Basketball Encyclopedia nicely track the history of the rivalry.  In the 1950s, when the rivalry was at its peak, Kansas State finished the decade ranked as the #3 program in the nation and KU was ranked as #4.  In the 1960s KU was ranked #9 for the decade and KSU was ranked #11.  In the 1970s, the programs were again nearly even, with Kansas State ranked at #24 and KU at #25.  In the 1980s some separation appeared, as KU finished the decade ranked at #19 and Kansas State at #31.  The big difference appeared in the 1990s and 2000s when KU was ranked at #4 and #2 for the decades, while Kansas State does not appear anywhere in the top 40.

Even when the schools are at different levels, upsets are always a possibility in the rivalry, as when Kansas State upset a KU team that was ranked #1 in the AP Poll on January 17, 1994, or when KU pulled the upset on a K-State team ranked #1 on January 17, 1953. Most recently, K-State beat a #1 KU team on February 14, 2011 in Manhattan. Over the decades, the rivalry has seen a number of notable coaches match wits, including Jack Gardner, Tex Winter, Lon Kruger and Jack Hartman at Kansas State, and James Naismith, Phog Allen, Larry Brown, Roy Williams and Bill Self at KU.

Early years
The teams were fairly even up until the 1930s, with the series standings at 31–27 in favor of Kansas entering the decade. During the 1930s and 40s, Kansas gained a large lead in the standings with a number of win streaks, including 22 in a row from 1938 to 1947. In 1935 Kansas tied an NCAA record by beating Kansas State five times in the same calendar year, a feat that was only accomplished one other time, when Kansas beat Nebraska five times in 1909.

1950s 
Both schools were national title contenders in the 1950s, with Kansas State starting the decade in the title game of the 1951 NCAA tournament, and KU winning the title at the 1952 NCAA tournament. One of the more notable games of the 1951–1952 season was a 90–88 overtime victory by #4 KU over #8 K-State in the 1951 Big Seven Holiday Tournament. KU returned to the national title game in the 1953 NCAA Tournament missing back to back titles by 1 point, claiming the league title along the way over a KSU team that had earlier been the top-ranked basketball team in the country.

The rivalry heated up further with the arrival of Bob Boozer at Kansas State and Wilt Chamberlain at KU in the middle of the decade. In the 1955–1956 season, Kansas State split the season series with KU and won the Big Seven Conference title. The following year, Chamberlain led KU to the league title and a triple-overtime loss to North Carolina in the title game of the 1957 NCAA tournament. Kansas and Kansas State played another classic the following season, when Boozer scored 32 points in a 79–75 double-overtime victory at KU on February 3, 1958, while KSU was ranked #4 and KU was ranked #2. (When the two teams had previously met that season on December 30, 1957, they were ranked #2 and #3 in the country.) Following that season, KSU made another appearance in the Final Four. To close the decade, Kansas State swept the season series from KU on the way to a 25–2 record and a #1 ranking in the final AP Poll for 1959.

During the 1950s, the two schools also engaged in one-upsmanship in facilities. In prior decades, Kansas State had played their games in Nichols Hall, which doubled as a gymnasium, livestock pavilion, and pool.  In the late-1940s the state Legislature approved and paid for the construction of a new and much larger basketball facility.  In 1950 Kansas State opened Ahearn Field House, one of the largest basketball facilities in the country at the time, which seated 14,000 spectators.  Meanwhile, KU still played their home games on a converted stage in Hoch Auditorium with a seating capacity of 5,500.  In response to the construction of Ahearn, the University of Kansas successfully lobbied the Legislature to approve the construction of Allen Fieldhouse, which would seat 17,000. KU opened the facility with a 77–66 victory over Kansas State on March 1, 1955.

This period also saw the beginning of the 'Sunflower Doubleheader', with two non-conference teams visiting the state to play KU and K-State at one venue one night, then switching venues and opponents the following evening.  This event was held from 1957 to 1968, and featured national powerhouses such as UCLA, Xavier, San Francisco, St. Joseph's, Cal, and Marquette.

1960s and 1970s 
The basketball rivalry between the two schools continued unabated through the 1960s and 1970s, with the two schools competing annually for the Big Eight Conference championship (see chart below).  In Dick Harp's last two seasons as the KU coach, the Jayhawks plummeted to losing records of 7–18 in 1962 and 12–13 in 1963. Nevertheless, in the championship game of the Big Eight Holiday Tournament in December 1962, KU posted a surprising 90-88 quadruple-overtime victory over K-State.  Also, on February 20, 1965, one of the classic pranks in the series was perpetrated when a pair of 6x12 banners saying "Go Cats, Kill Snob Hill Again" unfurled on the east and west sides of the Allen Fieldhouse scoreboard with eight minutes left in the first half.  Unfortunately for the Cats, this did not come to pass, as KU beat K-State 88–66.  Another popular "prank" perpetrated by Kansas State students throughout the years is throwing live chickens, painted blue and red, on the court during pre-game introductions, as a taunt at the Kansas mascot, the Jayhawk.  For years the Kansas State administration has attempted to stop this practice, and following a nationally televised game on February 19, 2007, PETA complained about it in a letter to KSU President Jon Wefald.

1980s 
The 1980s saw the return of star power to the schools and arguably the rivalry's most high-profile game.  At the start of the decade, Rolando Blackman at Kansas State and Darnell Valentine at KU squared off in some classic match-ups. To close the decade, it was Mitch Richmond (K-State) and Danny Manning (KU) battling.

With Richmond and Manning in their senior years, the 1987–1988 season proved to be eventful in the rivalry. In the first matchup of the season, on January 30, 1988, Richmond scored 35 points to lead Kansas State to a 72-61 win to halt KU's then-record 55-game home winning streak. On February 18, KU turned the tables, prevailing 64–63 in Ahearn Field House to deny K-State a victory over KU in the old field house's last year. In what was supposed to be the rubber game, in the 1988 Big Eight Conference tournament, Kansas State won a decisive victory by a 69–54 score.

Both teams qualified for the NCAA tournament, and after three wins apiece in the tournament they faced each other on March 27 in Pontiac, Michigan, for the right to advance to the Final Four. Led by Manning's 20 points, KU turned a tight game into a runaway and prevailed 71–58. They eventually advanced to claim the school's second NCAA Tournament Championship. That game in the Pontiac Silverdome was the first ever meeting between the 'Hawks and the 'Cats not played in Lawrence, Manhattan, or Kansas City, Missouri.

The 1990s and 2000s 
The rivalry slipped in significance after the 1988 season, as K-State slowly declined in the Big 8 and Big 12 conferences and KU saw sustained success under new coach Roy Williams. During Williams' tenure at Kansas, the Jayhawks went 50–6 against the Wildcats. Only occasionally would K-State make some noise, such as the 68–64 win over then-#1 KU in Allen Fieldhouse in 1994.

From 1994 to 2005, KU won 31 straight games against K-State, the longest streak for either school in the series. Also, from 1984 to 2007, KU won 24 straight games on the Wildcats' home floor, the third longest win-streak on an opponents home court in NCAA history.  During the latter streak, K-State won seven games against KU, but all were away from Manhattan: four games in Lawrence (1988, 1989, 1994, 2006) and three games in the Big Eight Tournament in Kansas City (1988, 1989, 1993).  The streak began in Ahearn Field House, where KU won the final five meetings, and carried over into Bramlage Coliseum, where KU won the first 19 contests. KU's streak at Bramlage Coliseum came to an end on January 30, 2008, when #22-ranked Kansas State upset previously-unbeaten #2 Kansas 84–75.

2006–present 
When Kansas State hired coach Bob Huggins to replace Jim Wooldridge in the 2006 off-season, Huggins sought to reinvigorate the rivalry.  At K-State's "Madness in Manhattan" celebration to start the 2006–2007 season, Huggins referred to KU's 23-game winning streak in Manhattan and said that "February 19th is when we break the streak."  However, KU swept the season series from Kansas State, and Huggins departed following the season to coach his alma mater, West Virginia University.

The 2007–2008 season presented a contrast between youth and experience.  KU was led by the experienced coach Bill Self and retained a lineup of experienced players. Kansas State was led by a first-year head coach, Frank Martin, and featured one of the top-rated groups of freshman players in the nation. Prior to the season, Kansas State freshman phenom Michael Beasley boasted that "We're gonna beat KU at home. We're gonna beat 'em at their house. We're gonna beat 'em in Africa. Wherever we play we're gonna beat 'em."  KU came into the first match-up of the season, on January 30, 2008, with a 20–0 record and a #2 national ranking, but Kansas State prevailed 84–75, ending KU's long winning streak in Manhattan. On Kansas State's trip to Lawrence later that year, though, Kansas won 88–74, leaving Beasley's prophecy unfulfilled.  Both schools advanced to the NCAA tournament at the conclusion of the 2008 regular season, and Kansas went on to win its third NCAA Tournament championship.

The rivalry featured three high-profile match-ups during the 2009–2010 season. In the first game on January 30, 2010, in Manhattan with ESPN's College GameDay broadcasting live from the game, Kansas came into the game ranked #2, while Kansas State was ranked #11.  KU prevailed in overtime 81–79, in a game that ESPN described as a "classic."  After the game, Kansas center Cole Aldrich said, "You're going to get done playing basketball, and you're going to look back and say, 'I loved playing that game.'" The Wichita Eagle wrote that the "rivalry is back." The second match-up on March 3, 2010 was the first time since 1958 that both teams were ranked in the top 5 with Kansas at #2 and KSU at #5. With number one seed implications on the line, Frank Martin called it "the biggest game we've ever played at K-State". Kansas went on to win 82–65 and secure sole possession of the Big 12 Championship. The two teams met again in the 2010 Big 12 men's basketball tournament championship game with KU ranked #1 in the nation and KSU ranked #9. The Jayhawks won 72–64, completing a three-game sweep of the Wildcats and winning the Big 12 Tournament title.

After Frank Martin left K-State in 2012 to take the coaching job with the South Carolina Gamecocks, he was replaced by Bruce Weber, former Illinois head coach. Weber led his first Kansas State team to a co-conference championship with KU in 2013. For Kansas, it was the ninth straight league title and eleventh in twelve seasons; for Kansas State, it was the first regular season conference title since winning the Big Eight in 1977. During the regular season, Kansas swept Kansas State with a 59–55 victory in Manhattan and an 83–62 victory in Lawrence. The two teams met a third time in the finals of the 2013 Big 12 Tournament, where Kansas bested Kansas State 70–54 for the three-game sweep.

The 2013-2014 season saw a season split between the rivals.  Kansas won 86–60 in the first meeting in Lawrence, and Kansas State won in Manhattan in overtime, 85–82, with ESPN's College GameDay again broadcasting from the game. After winning in Manhattan again in 2015, Kansas State had won four of the last eight at home since ending KU's 24-game winning streak in Manhattan in 2008.  Kansas State has since dropped 6 of the last 7 at home.

One of the ugliest moments in the rivalry's history took place in January 2020 in Allen Fieldhouse, when a brawl erupted between KU and KSU players near the end of an 81-60 Jayhawk win over the Wildcats. The brawl started after KU's Silvio De Sousa had the ball stolen from him by KSU's DaJuan Gordon while attempting to dribble out the last few seconds of the game with a 21-point lead.  De Sousa recovered to block a layup attempt and then stood over Gordon. In response to a perceived taunt, the Kansas State bench cleared followed quickly by Kansas' bench, and punches were thrown. The brawl went into the handicap seating area, knocking over fans. At one point De Sousa picked up a chair over his head, but dropped it seeing only KU players in front of him. The brawl resulted in a KU assistant coach suffering a broken arm, multiple school enforced player suspensions, and separate suspensions being handed down from the Big 12.

Conference basketball supremacy 
From 1946 through 1978, Kansas and Kansas State made the competition for the basketball title for their conference (known as the Big Six, Big Seven and Big Eight during this time) virtually a two-way affair. During this 33-year period, KU or KSU won or shared the title 26 times. The following chart shows the conference titles captured by the Sunflower Showdown schools during this span of time.  Since 1991 Kansas has won or shared the Big 8 and Big 12 titles 24 of the 30 years.   Kansas and Kansas State shared the Big 12 regular-season title for the 2012–2013 season.

Football 

After the two programs began playing each other in football in 1902, ill will soon surfaced.  Following the 1909 contest, a 5–3 KU victory, a dispute between the schools led them to cancel the game scheduled for the 1910 season. After taking the break in 1910, the teams have met on the field every autumn since, and the 2010 game marked the 100th straight year the two teams played. Only five other series in college football history have been contested for more consecutive years.

KU was notably dominant in the series during the early years, building a 17–1–3 advantage through the 1923 season. Since 1923 the programs have been much more even, K-State leads 48–47–2 during that period (including a 1980 forfeit by KU).

Because KU does not acknowledge the forfeit as a loss, the two schools disagree on the overall series record: KU says it leads the series 65–50–5, while Kansas State reports the record as 64–51–5 following the 2020 game. Kansas cites NCAA policy to explain its refusal to reckon the 1980 game as a Kansas State win; the policy states that statistics and records are not altered unless imposed by NCAA Executive action.  The forfeit was voted on by the conference members and no such action was ever imposed by the NCAA.  Therefore, the game result and statistics remain in the NCAA records.

After the first 90 years of the rivalry, Kansas led the series 59–26–5 following 1992 game. The series swung in Kansas State's favor over the next 27 years. Kansas has never trailed in the all-time record.

The teams began competing for the Governor's Cup in 1969, and many of the most storied or interesting games between the programs have come during this era, including a 1995 match-up between sixth-ranked Kansas and fourteenth-ranked Kansas State, won by Kansas State 41–7.

During the 1990s and early 2000s, Kansas State fielded a much stronger team – annually garnering high national rankings – resulting in an 11-game winning streak over KU that lasted from 1993 through the 2003 season, finally ending in 2004.  That winning streak was the longest for either team in the history of the rivalry, now second to KSU's current 13-game winning streak that began with the 2009 game.

Baseball 

The schools first met on the baseball field in 1898. The all-time series record is disputed between the two schools, with the KU media guide listing the Jayhawks ahead 185-176-1, while the KSU media guide list the series with KSU ahead 178-169-1 (following the 2017 regular season). The discrepancy is likely the result of highly inaccurate records by both schools for the early years of the series, with games missing from both record books. For example, in the 1912 season the KU media guide states that the teams met four times with KU winning three of four. On the other hand, the KSU media guide lists only one matchup, with KSU the victor. A four-game series was the standard at the time, as both record books reflect a four-game series in 1911 and 1913. Another example is in the 1914 season where the KU record books reflect four matchups with each team winning two, while the KSU books show only two matchups and KSU the winner of both. In the 1916 season the KSU record books show a four-game series with KU winning all four, while KU books do not reflect having played KSU at all. These sort of discrepancies are frequent until the late 20s when both schools books begin to coincide.

Series standings 
The schools compete annually in football, men's basketball, women's basketball, women's volleyball, baseball, cross country, track and field, women's tennis, rowing, men's golf, and women's golf. Kansas State does not currently sponsor fast-pitch softball and neither sponsor men's tennis. Below are the series records in the major sports that both schools currently compete in. Kansas leads the active series in all sports combined 630–505–9 according to KU or 615–510–9 according to K-State.

Notes

References

External links 

 Sunflower Showdown football site
 Sunflower Showdown basketball site
 College Football in Kansas
 College Basketball in Kansas

College sports rivalries in the United States
College basketball rivalries in the United States
Kansas Jayhawks football
Kansas Jayhawks basketball
Kansas State Wildcats football
Kansas State Wildcats basketball
1902 establishments in Kansas